Catlin is an unincorporated community in the northwest corner of Raccoon Township, Parke County, in the U.S. state of Indiana.

History
A post office was established at Catlin in 1861, and remained in operation until 1965. Hiram Catlin, an early settler, gave the community its name.

Geography
Catlin is located at  an elevation of 548 feet.

References

Unincorporated communities in Indiana
Unincorporated communities in Parke County, Indiana